Heaven Can Wait is a 1978 American sports fantasy comedy-drama film directed by Warren Beatty and Buck Henry about a young man (played by Beatty) being mistakenly taken to heaven by his guardian angel, and the resulting complications of how this mistake can be undone, given that his earthly body has been cremated. It was the second film adaptation of Harry Segall's play of the same name, the first being Here Comes Mr. Jordan (1941).

Beatty was influenced by the beliefs of his sister, actress Shirley Maclaine, in mysticism and reincarnation. 

The film was nominated for nine Academy Awards. The cast includes Beatty, Julie Christie, and Jack Warden, all of whom had appeared in Shampoo (1975).

In 2001, a third film adaptation of the play was done, titled Down to Earth, sharing its name with the sequel to Here Comes Mr. Jordan (1941).

Plot
Joe Pendleton, a backup quarterback for the American football team Los Angeles Rams, is looking forward to leading his team to the Super Bowl. While he is riding his bicycle through a tunnel, an overzealous guardian angel on his first assignment, known only as The Escort, sees a large truck heading into the other end of the tunnel towards Joe. The Escort plucks Joe out of his body early in the mistaken belief that Joe was about to be killed.

Once in the afterlife, Joe refuses to believe that his time was up, and upon investigation, Mr. Jordan (the Escort's supervisor) discovers that Joe was going to just narrowly miss the truck and he was not destined to die until March 20, 2025, at 10:17 AM. Unfortunately, his body has already been cremated, so a new body must be found for him. After rejecting several possible men who are about to die, Joe is persuaded to accept the body of a multi-millionaire industrialist. Leo Farnsworth has just been drugged and drowned in his bathtub by his cheating gold digger wife Julia Farnsworth and her lover Tony Abbott, Farnsworth's personal secretary.

Julia and Tony are confused when Leo reappears alive and well, and Farnsworth's domestic staff is confused by the changes in some of his habits and tastes. Still obsessed with his football destiny, Farnsworth/Joe buys the Rams to lead them to the Super Bowl as their quarterback. To succeed, he must first convince and then secure the help of a longtime friend and trainer Max Corkle to get his new body in shape. At the same time, he falls in love with Betty Logan, an environmental activist, whom he met when she came to his doorstep to protest the original Farnsworth's corporate policies.

With the Rams about to play in the Super Bowl, all the characters face a crisis. Mr. Jordan informs Joe that he must give up Farnsworth's body as well. Joe resists but hints to Betty that she might someday meet someone else, possibly another quarterback, and should think of him. Julia and Abbott continue their murderous plans, and Abbott finally shoots Farnsworth/Joe dead. The Rams are forced to start Tom Jarrett, another quarterback, in the climactic game. A detective, Lieutenant Krim, interrogates the suspects while they watch the game on television. With the help of Corkle, he gets Julia and Abbott to incriminate each other.

After a brutal hit on the field, Jarrett is killed. With Mr. Jordan's help, Joe occupies Jarrett's body and leads the Rams to victory. During the team's postgame celebration, Corkle finds Joe, and when he realizes that it is him, they share an emotional embrace. As Joe is being interviewed on television, Mr. Jordan tells him that, to live as Tom Jarrett, he will have to lose the memories of his life as Joe Pendleton. As Mr. Jordan disappears, Tom/Joe becomes disoriented. Corkle goes to find Joe later and is crestfallen to realize that Joe has "left" Tom.

Tom bumps into Betty while leaving the stadium. They strike up a conversation, and each appears to recognize the other, but they do not know how. The lights go out in the stadium as they exit the venue, and Tom says something that reminds Betty of Farnsworth/Joe. Looking into his eyes, Betty remembers what he said to her before and whispers “You’re the quarterback.” Tom asks her to go with him for coffee, and she accepts.

Cast

 Warren Beatty as Joe Pendleton
 Julie Christie as Betty Logan
 James Mason as Mr. Jordan
 Jack Warden as Max Corkle
 Charles Grodin as Tony Abbott
 Dyan Cannon as Julia Farnsworth
 Buck Henry as The Escort
 Vincent Gardenia as Krim
 Joseph Maher as Sisk
 Hamilton Camp as Bentley
 Arthur Malet as Everett
 Stephanie Faracy as Corinne
 Jeannie Linero as Lavinia
 Larry Block as Peters
 Frank Campanella as Conway
 Dick Enberg as TV Interviewer
 Dolph Sweet as Head Coach
 R.G. Armstrong as General Manager
 Ed V. Peck as Trainer
 John Randolph as Former Owner
 Will Hare as Team Doctor
 Lee Weaver as Way Station Attendant
 Roger Bowen as Newspaperman
 Keene Curtis as Oppenheim
 Morgan Farley as Middleton
 William Bogert as Lawson
 Peter Tomarken as Reporter
 William Sylvester as Nuclear Reporter
 Jerry Scanlan as Hodges
 Jim Boeke as Kowalsky
 Les Josephson as Owens
 Jack T. Snow as Cassidy
 Curt Gowdy as TV Commentator
 Al DeRogatis as TV Color Analyst

Several former Los Angeles Rams players have cameo roles in the film, including Deacon Jones, Les Josephson, Jack T. Snow, Jim Boeke, and Charley Cowan. Some well-known sportscasters also appear, playing familiar roles. Curt Gowdy and Al DeRogatis can be heard doing the Super Bowl play-by-play commentary. Dick Enberg conducts an abortive postgame interview of Joe Pendleton/Tom Jarrett. Beatty lobbied hard for Cary Grant to accept the role of Mr. Jordan, going so far as to have Grant's ex-wife, Dyan Cannon, who stars as Julia Farnsworth, urge him to take the role. Although Grant was tempted, he ultimately decided not to end his retirement from film-making.

Production
Beatty initially wanted Muhammad Ali to play the central character, but because of Ali's continued commitment to boxing, Beatty changed the character from a boxer to an American football player, and played the character himself. The type of instrument he played was also changed; in Here Comes Mr. Jordan, Pendleton assays "The Last Rose of Summer" on the alto saxophone, and in the 1978 film, he plays "Ciribiribin" on a soprano sax. The music during the comic training scene with Joe and the servants at the Farnsworth mansion, as well as the later training session with the Rams is Handel's Sonata No. 3 in F Major, performed by Paul Brodie (sopranino saxophone) and Antonin Kubalek (piano). The main theme is the song "Heaven Can Wait" performed by Dave Grusin and the London Symphony Orchestra. Neil Diamond composed a song titled "Heaven Can Wait" specifically for the film that he thought would be a good theme song, but Beatty declined to use it. The Paul McCartney and Wings song "Did We Meet Somewhere Before?" was considered as a theme song for the film, but was ruled out. It later appeared in the film Rock 'n' Roll High School (1979).

The Super Bowl game (Pittsburgh Steelers vs. the Rams) was filmed during halftime of the San Diego Chargers vs. Los Angeles Rams preseason game at the Los Angeles Memorial Coliseum on September 1, 1977. (About a year and a half after the film's release, in January 1980, the Rams and Steelers met in real life in Super Bowl XIV.)

The estate used as Farnsworth mansion was filmed at Filoli, located in Woodside, California, south of San Francisco. Another filming location, albeit brief, was at Evergreen Cemetery in Los Angeles on the grounds beside the Gothic stone chapel in the scene where Joe discovers his body was cremated and scattered on the cemetery grounds.

The football stadium used in the film was the home of the Los Angeles Rams team at Los Angeles Memorial Coliseum at 3911 South Figueroa Street, Exposition Park in Los Angeles.

Reception

Critical response
On Rotten Tomatoes, the film holds an approval "Certified Fresh" rating of 87% based on 47 reviews, with an average rating of 7.6/10. The site's critical consensus reads "A throwback to the high-gloss screwball comedies of the 1940s, Heaven Can Wait beguiles with seamless production values and great comic relief from Charles Grodin and Dyan Cannon." Metacritic gave the film a weighted average score of 72 out of 100 based on 10 critics, indicating "generally favorable reviews".

Roger Ebert gave the film three stars out of four and called it "the kind of upbeat screwball comedy Hollywood used to do smoothly and well." Gene Siskel gave the film three-and-a-half stars out of four and declared it "a delightful film that is both surprisingly fresh and old-fashioned." Vincent Canby of The New York Times wrote that the film "hasn't much personality of its own. Instead, it has a kind of earnest cheerfulness that is sometimes most winning. Mr. Beatty and Miss Christie are performers who bring to their roles the easy sort of gravity that establishes characters of import, no matter how simply they are drawn in the script." Charles Champlin of the Los Angeles Times wrote that "Beatty and his accomplices have brought it off, with only minor patches of turbulence. The script has been expertly contemporized." Gary Arnold of The Washington Post wrote "Heaven Can Wait is easily the most appealing new American movie on the market. It manages to preserve much of the charm and romantic fantasy that worked for its predecessor, the 1941 crowd-pleaser Here Comes Mr. Jordan, while freshening up some of the settings and details and tailoring the roles to a different cast." Penelope Gilliatt of The New Yorker praised the script as "sometimes both loopy and brainy", but asked "good grief, what is all this braininess and talent doing in a remake of a Harry Segall play that has no relation to the real world we come out into from the cinema? One can see why there were films about transmigration and reincarnation during the war, but not now."

Awards and nominations

American Film Institute lists
 AFI's 100 Years...100 Laughs – Nominated
 AFI's 100 Years...100 Passions – Nominated
 AFI's 10 Top 10 – Nominated Fantasy Film

See also
 List of films about angels

References

External links

 
 
 
 
 

1978 films
1970s fantasy comedy films
1978 romantic comedy films
1970s romantic fantasy films
1970s sports films
1970s American films
American fantasy comedy films
Remakes of American films
American films based on plays
American football films
American romantic comedy films
American romantic fantasy films
American sports comedy films
Best Musical or Comedy Picture Golden Globe winners
Body swapping in films
1978 directorial debut films
1970s English-language films
Films about angels
Films about death
Films about the afterlife
Films about reincarnation
Films directed by Buck Henry
Films directed by Warren Beatty
Films featuring a Best Supporting Actress Golden Globe-winning performance
Films featuring a Best Musical or Comedy Actor Golden Globe winning performance
Films produced by Warren Beatty
Films scored by Dave Grusin
Films set in country houses
Films whose art director won the Best Art Direction Academy Award
Religious comedy films
Resurrection in film
Films with screenplays by Buck Henry
Films with screenplays by Elaine May
Films with screenplays by Robert Towne
Films with screenplays by Warren Beatty
Paramount Pictures films